The 1st Helpmann Awards ceremony was presented by the Australian Entertainment Industry Association (AEIA) (currently known by its trade name, Live Performance Australia), for achievements in disciplines of Australia's live performance sectors. The ceremony took place on 25 March 2001 at the Lyric Theatre, Sydney and was hosted by Simon Burke. During the ceremony, the AEIA handed out awards in twelve categories for achievements in theatre, musicals, opera, ballet, dance and concerts.

Australian works The Boy from Oz (musical), The Eighth Wonder (opera), Life After George (theatre) and the opening ceremony of the 2000 Olympics in Sydney were major award recipients.

Winners and nominees
In the following tables, winners are listed first and highlighted in boldface.

Theatre

Musicals

Opera

Dance and Physical Theatre

Industry

Lifetime Achievement

References

External links

Helpmann Awards
Helpmann Awards
Helpmann Awards
Helpmann Awards, 1st
Helpmann Awards